Nathan Milgate (born 10 May 1987) is a marksman from Herne Bay who competed in the 2008 Summer Paralympics in Beijing.

References

Living people
1987 births
British male sport shooters
Paralympic shooters of Great Britain
Shooters at the 2008 Summer Paralympics
Shooters at the 2012 Summer Paralympics
Sportspeople from Canterbury
21st-century British people